Železník is a village and municipality in Svidník District in the Prešov Region of north-eastern Slovakia. It has a population of about 465 people. When it was under Hungarian rule it was called Vashegy, which literally means “Iron Hill”, and the mineral vashegyite is named after this village.

History
In historical records the village was first mentioned in 1382.

References

External links
 
 
Stats

Villages and municipalities in Svidník District
Šariš